The New Burlington Galleries was an art gallery at 5 Burlington Gardens, Mayfair, London.

From 11 June to 4 July 1936, they held the International Surrealist Exhibition, the first full exhibition of surrealist art in the UK.

From 7 June to 28 August 1938, the gallery showed Twentieth Century German Art, the largest international response to the National Socialist campaign against so-called ‘degenerate art’.

In October 1938, they exhibited Picasso's Guernica together with preparatory paintings and sketches to raise funds for the National Joint Committee for Spanish Relief.

References

Defunct art galleries in London